2022 Abu Dhabi T10 is the sixth season of the Abu Dhabi T10. The matches will have a 10-over-a-side format with a time duration of 90 minutes. The tournament were played from 23 November to 4 December 2022 at the Sheikh Zayed Cricket Stadium.

Squads

Points table

 Advanced to Qualifier 1 Advanced to Eliminator

League stage

Playoffs

Preliminary

3rd place play-off

Final

Statistics

Most runs

Most wickets

End of the season awards
Player end of season awards.

Team end of season prize money.

References

2022 in Emirati cricket
Abu Dhabi T10 League